Plongeur, the French word for diver may refer to the following
The French submarine Plongeur
An employee charged with washing dishes